Muhammad Kazim Allahyar was a politician in Afghanistan who served as Deputy governor of Ghazni Province. He was appointed Deputy Governor in July 2005. He was killed in a suicide attack on 28 September 2010 in  Ghazni city with his son, nephew, driver and three guards.

References 

2010 deaths
Politicians of Ghazni Province
Deputy Governors of Ghazni Province